DP Architects Pvt. Ltd. is a Singaporean multinational architectural industrial design firm. It started as Design Partnership in 1967 and was incorporated as a private limited company in 1993. It is a multi-disciplinary design consultancy. It is one of the largest architectural practices in the world.

The DP group is composed of: DP Architects, DP Consultants, DP Design, DP Engineers, DP Facade, DP Green, DP Lighting, DP Sustainable Design and DP Urban. It has over 900 staff with 16 offices worldwide.

The work of DP Architects includes The Dubai Mall, as well as landmarks in Singapore, such as the People's Park Complex and Golden Mile Complex designed and constructed in the 1960s. The firm was involved in the master planning of the Orchard Road shopping belt and the development of Marina Centre. DP Architects’ activity includes retail, hotel, resort, commercial office, residential, convention centre, technology parks, medical, religious, educational and civic institutions, and airport and aviation-related support facilities.

History
The firm was started in 1967 with William Lim Siew Wai, Tay Kheng Soon, and Koh Seow Chuan when they left the Malayan Architects Co-Partnership and founded Design Partnership after its dissolution to start their own firm with an initial staff strength of 18. In 1972, Gan Eng Oon joined and became a partner followed by Chan Sui Him in 1973 and became a partner subsequently in 1974.
In 1974, Tay Kheng Soon, who graduated from Singapore Polytechnic in 1963, retired and establish his own practice, Akitek Tenggara. A year later in 1975, Design Partnership was dissolved and reformed as DP Architects Pte (DPA). William Lim retired in 1981 and established his own practice.

The company expanded in 1982 with the establishment of two subsidiary companies, DP Design and DP Consultants. DP Architects was registered formally as a private limited with 200 employees in Singapore. Leading the firm since its inception, Chan Sui Him was succeeded by Francis Lee Seng Wee in 2004 as the CEO while he was promoted to Chairman of the firm. In 2016, Francis Lee Seng Wee took over the reins from Chan Sui Him as Chairman, while Chan Sui Him assumed a mentorship role as Senior Director. Angelene Chan was promoted to CEO.

In 2021, as part of the firm’s leadership renewal and continuity plan, Seah Chee Huang has been appointed its Chief Executive Officer. Outgoing CEO, Angelene Chan has taken over the reins of Chairman from Francis Lee, who has assumed the position of Senior Director and advisor. To date, Chan Sui Him continues in his mentorship role as Senior Director.

Sustainable design 
DP Architects is considered a leader in sustainable design. The Building and Construction Authority of Singapore (BCA) has recognized DP Architects as one of the top three architecture firms in Singapore with the highest number of Green Mark Platinum and GoldPlus projects, with 25 or more projects rated Green Mark Gold+ or Platinum. The BCA Green Mark system is a green building rating system to evaluate a building for its environmental impact and performance, with Gold+ and Platinum being the highest two ratings for efficiency. DP Architects has also scored many firsts for sustainably designed architecture, winning the first two Green Mark District awards for Resorts World Sentosa and NUS University Town, both achieving the second highest rating of GoldPlus.

In 2015, DP Architects was awarded the Built Environment Leadership (BEL) Gold Class Award by BCA. The DP group of companies received a total of four BCA-SGBC Green Building Individual Commendation Awards in 2013, 2014 and 2015.

Notable projects
DPA is best known in Singapore for several architectural works of the late 1960s and early 1970s such as People's Park Complex, and Golden Mile Complex.

Dutch architect Rem Koolhaas said at a press conference when he visited Singapore in 2005: ‘These buildings (Golden Mile Complex and People's Park Complex) were not intended to be landmarks, but became landmarks.’

The firm is also known for its work on the Esplanade - Theatres on the Bay,The Dubai Mall, Resorts World Sentosa, and Singapore Sports Hub.

References

External links
 Official website of DP Architects Pte Ltd

Architecture firms of Singapore
Singaporean companies established in 1967
Design companies established in 1967